Amalda trippneri is a species of sea snail, a marine gastropod mollusk in the family Ancillariidae. It was named after Edmund Trippner at the request of Dr. Axel Alf.

Description

Distribution
It was found in the Saya de Malha Bank, between Mauritius and the Seychelles.

References

trippneri
Gastropods described in 1996